David Wolfe (March 1, 1915 – September 23, 1994) of New York City was an American film actor from 1949 to 1954.

Filmography

 The Vicious Circle (1948) - Defendant (uncredited)
 The Undercover Man (1949) - Stanley Weinburg
 House of Strangers (1949) - Prosecutor (uncredited)
 Flaming Fury (1949) - Tony Polacheck
 Slattery's Hurricane (1949) - Dr. Ross (uncredited)
 Sword in the Desert (1949) - Gershon
 Tokyo Joe (1949) - Photo Sergeant (uncredited)
 Bagdad (1949) - Mahmud
 A Dangerous Profession (1949) - Matthew Dawson
 Side Street (1950) - Smitty (uncredited)
 Appointment with Danger (1950) - David Goodman
 Where the Sidewalk Ends (1950) - Sid Kramer, Scalise Hood (uncredited)
 Prisoners in Petticoats (1950) - Sam Clark
 Right Cross (1950) - Handler (uncredited)
 Kansas Raiders (1950) - Rudolph Tate
 I Can Get It for You Wholesale (1951) - Speaker on Dais (uncredited)
 The Scarf (1951) - Level Louie
 Smuggler's Island (1951) - Lorca
 The Mark of the Renegade (1951) - Landlord
 The Guest (1951, Short) - Martin Androvitch
 The Cimarron Kid (1952) - Sam Swanson
 5 Fingers (1952) - Da Costa (uncredited)
 Wait 'Til the Sun Shines, Nellie (1952) - Sam Eichenbogen (uncredited)
 Bloodhounds of Broadway (1952) - Counsel (uncredited)
 The Iron Mistress (1952) - James Black (uncredited)
 Salt of the Earth (1954) - Barton (final film role)

Television
 Rebound (1952) - Walter
 Dangerous Assignment (1952) - Goya

External links
 
 

1915 births
1994 deaths
American male film actors
20th-century American male actors
American gay actors
20th-century LGBT people